Maurice Guibert (12 August 1856 – 13 January 1922) was a French photographer best known today as a friend of Henri de Toulouse-Lautrec.

He was an agent for the champagne company Moët and Chandon and a member of the Société française de photographie. Little else is known of him other than his self-portraits and photos of Toulouse-Lautrec that often led to collaborations such as in the painting À La Mie:

External links 
 Maurice Guibert in the RKD

1856 births
1913 deaths
19th-century French photographers
20th-century French photographers